The 2006–07 Ligue Magnus season was the 86th season of the Ligue Magnus, the top level of ice hockey in France. 14 teams participated in the league, and Brûleurs de Loups de Grenoble won their fifth league title.

Regular season

Playoffs

Relegation

Round 1 
 Ducs de Dijon - Anglet Hormadi Élite 4:1 (5:3, 4:1, 1:4, 5:1, 7:4)

Round 2 
 Gap Hockey Club - Ducs de Dijon 0:2/2:5

External links 
 Season on hockeyarchives.info

1
Fra
Ligue Magnus seasons